Fays may refer to:

places in France:
Fays, Haute-Marne, a commune in the Haute-Marne department 
Fays, Vosges, a commune in the Vosges department 
Fays-la-Chapelle, a commune in the Aube department
Les Deux-Fays, a commune in the Jura department
places in Belgium
Fays, a hamlet in the commune Ciney
Fays, a hamlet in the commune Theux
surname:
Raphaël Faÿs, a French guitarist

See also
 Fay (disambiguation)
 Feys (surname)